"Yes Forever" is the nineteenth single by Japanese recording artist Misia. It was released on April 30, 2008 as the first single from Misia's ninth studio album Just Ballade.

Background 

The single was released as the first of a set of three releases planned for a three-month period. The first press edition comes housed in a cardboard sleeve and includes a 720mm×477mm poster of the cover artwork.

"Yes Forever" was written by Misia and composed and produced by Sinkiroh. CDJournal described the song as a "medium tempo ballad which makes ample use of Misia's crystal-clear vocals and showcases her personality with ease." It was used in commercials for Kose cosmetics Sekkisei, starring Nanako Matsushima, which were broadcast throughout Asia. The single comprises both the single and piano versions of "Yes Forever."

Despite being the original, the single version was not featured in Just Ballade; instead the piano version, produced by Tohru Shigemi, was included.

After the success that had the single of Misia, the acoustic dubstep remix version made by Noisia was not included in the single for unknown reasons, and this remix to date is still unpublished and has never been published.

Chart performance 
"Yes Forever" debuted on the Oricon Daily Singles chart at number 7 and peaked at number 15 on the Oricon Weekly Singles chart, with 6,761 copies sold in its first week. The single charted for five weeks and sold a total of 10,505 copies.

Track listing

Charts

Release history

References

External links 

2008 singles
Misia songs
Songs written by Misia
2008 songs
BMG Japan singles